Phyllonorycter ostryaefoliella is a moth of the family Gracillariidae. It is known from Canada (Nova Scotia, Ontario and Québec) and the United States (Connecticut, Illinois, New York, Kentucky, Maine and Vermont).

The wingspan is 6-6.5 mm.

The larvae feed on Ostrya species, including Ostrya virginiana and Ostrya virginica. They mine the leaves of their host plant. The mine has the form of a tentiform mine on the underside the leaf. They are usually made near the margin and are much wrinkled when mature. The larvae, which are of the cylindrical type and pale yellow, spin oval cocoons of frass and silk in which pupation takes place.

References

External links
Bug Guide
mothphotographersgroup
Phyllonorycter at microleps.org

ostryaefoliella
Moths of North America
Moths described in 1859